William Smith House, also known as Brooks, is a historic home located at Wrightstown, Bucks County, Pennsylvania. The original section was built in 1686, and was a two-story, walnut log cabin.  A fieldstone addition was built in 1690.  The log section was subsequently covered in clapboard.  Sympathetic modern additions were built in 1965 and 1968.  It is the oldest structure in Wrightstown and one of the oldest in the nation.

It was added to the National Register of Historic Places in 1974.

References

External links

Houses on the National Register of Historic Places in Pennsylvania
Houses completed in 1690
Houses in Bucks County, Pennsylvania
Historic American Buildings Survey in Pennsylvania
National Register of Historic Places in Bucks County, Pennsylvania
1690 establishments in Pennsylvania